Ephrem Yousif Abba Mansoor (born June 18, 1951, Bakhdida, Iraq) is a Syriac Catholic cleric and the current archbishop of Baghdad.

Life 
Abba received his priestly ordination from Emmanuel Daddi, the former Archbishop of Mosul, on June 30, 1978. He was the chancellor of the Syriac Catholic Church leadership in the United States and Canada.

He was elected Archbishop of Baghdad on June 26, 2010 by the Holy Synod of the Syriac Catholic Church. Pope Benedict XVI consented to the election on March 1, 2011. The Syriac Catholic Patriarchate of Antioch, Ignatius Joseph III Younan, sponsored his episcopal ordination on April 16 of the same year. His Co-Consecrators were his predecessors, Athanase Matti Shaba Matoka, Jules Mikhael Al-Jamil, and the curia Archbishop of the Patriarchate of Antioch, and the emeritus Archbishop of Mosul, Basile Georges Casmoussa.

See also 
Catholic Church in Iraq

References

External links 

  

1951 births
Living people
People from Bakhdida
Syriac Catholic bishops
Iraqi Eastern Catholics
Iraqi archbishops